Magazeta is a popular Russian-language web-magazine and collaborative blog on China and Chinese culture.

Name and history
Founded in 2005 by Alexander Maltsev (马玉玺, Mǎ Yùxǐ), Magazeta developed from a LJ blog. The first publication is dated October 23, 2005.

In October 2006 Magazeta received two awards in The Best of Blogs competition.

In May 2007, Magazeta is re-launched at the current address, magazeta.com.

Magazeta was initially authored by a single person, but then was transformed into a collaborative blog with a number of authors.

The name "Magazeta" derives from the word "Ma" (the founder's Chinese surname), plus the Russian word "gazeta" (a journal, newspaper).

Blocking

Magazeta experienced several bans by the PRC authorities up to a complete blocking in September 2007. After more than a year, the website was unblocked by the Great Firewall in November 2008.

Projects and articles
Magazeta has started several online projects related to China, such as:

 Online Chinese-Russian dictionary of slang (including Internet slang)
 Laowaicast, a popular podcast on China-related topics, winner of Podcast Awards 2010 and 2011 in multiple categories, finalist of The BOBs in 2010.
 ChinaFilm, a collaborative translation project for Chinese movies

Topics
Recurrent topics for articles in Magazeta include:

 Chinese character of the day
 China-related news
 Chinese culture
 Chinese films
 Chinese language
 Photos of China
 Chinese music
 Interviews
 Podcasts

See also
Internet in the People's Republic of China

References

Internet properties established in 2005
Magazines established in 2005
Online magazines
Russian-language magazines
Russian websites
Cultural magazines